Jay DiZZle is an American stand-up comedian based out of Tulsa, Oklahoma. He got his start in 2004 and now performs nationally.

References

External links
Official Website
Comedy Central Jokes.com profile

1979 births
American stand-up comedians
Living people
Male actors from Tulsa, Oklahoma
21st-century American comedians